Chamak is a village in Esfandaqeh Rural District, in the Central District of Jiroft County, Kerman Province, Iran. At the 2006 census, its population was 219, in 53 families., it is also the name of certain people like "menaw" "loth" "kanis".

References 

Populated places in Jiroft County